The Amalka Supercomputing facility is the largest of the three Czech parallel supercomputers. It is used by Department of Space Physics,
Institute of Atmospheric Physics, Academy of Sciences of the Czech Republic.

The primary task is computation and visualisation in the area of space research for the European Space Agency or NASA, such as a preparation of Demeter (satellite) launch.

Amalka Supercomputing facility is credited with computing the first kinetic magnetic field model of Mercury in the MESSENGER project. It also helped to understand the results from the Cluster II mission.

At present, the facility is supporting the THEMIS (Time History of Events and Macroscale Interactions during Substorms) project. The results will be useful in planning for creating permanent human bases on Moon that will be protected from solar wind.

The current version runs Linux slackware and delivers 6.38 TFlops. Expansion and optimization of the infrastructure is being implemented by Sprinx Systems.

References

External links
I am Amálka, the most powerful supercomputer in the Czech Republic (Czech)

Supercomputers
Science and technology in the Czech Republic
Information technology in the Czech Republic